Pierre-Philippe Potier (also Pottié, Pottié, or Pothier; April 21, 1708 in Blandain, Hainaut, Belgium – July 16, 1781 in Windsor, Ontario Canada), was a Belgian Jesuit priest, missionary to the Hurons in New France, and lexicographer.

Life
Potier studied at the colleges of Tournai from 1721 to 1727,  and Douai from 1727 to 1729). He then entered the novitiate of the Society of Jesus (Jesuits) in Tournai on September 30, 1729. After a year of study of Letters in Lille, he taught for six years (1732–1738) at the college of Béthune. Then he studied theology in Douai in 1741 in preparation for the priesthood. He completed his third year at Armentières and was ordained at Tournai on February 2, 1743.

Shortly thereafter, Potier embarked at La Rochelle for New France on June 18, 1743, where he arrived on October 1 in Quebec. To learn the Huron language, he first spent eight months in the mission in Lorette, Manitoba, located in the Canadian prairies next to the Seine River.

In 1744 he was sent to the Jesuit mission on Bois Blanc Island in what is now Michigan where he met Armand de La Richardie. When de La Richardie became temporarily paralyzed, Potier took over the management of the mission. After the Bois Blanc Island mission is set on fire by a group led by Chief Orontony, the mission center was moved.

After the signing of the Treaty of Paris in 1763, Potier continued his mission to French Canadians for whom he founded the parish of Notre-Dame de l'Assomption in 1767, the first French parish in Ontario. Potier was thus the first parish priest in Ontario.

Lexicographer
Potier left numerous valuable manuscripts on the Huron language, grammar, a list of linguistic roots, a census of 45 Huron households, account registers of the Huron mission, etc. He composed a Huron-French vocabulary list. He is equally interested in the French language, and left many notebooks for his students on philosophy, theology, history, geography, and copies of his correspondence and itineraries of missionary trips, including a collection of French words and expressions in use at that time. A large part of these documents are in the archives of the Grand Séminaire de Québec.

All this testifies to the great culture and knowledge of Potier, his interest in knowledge, and an excellent mastery of the French, Latin and Huron languages. His writings also demonstrate that, by the end of the 18th century, the  French language was already well established in the Detroit area. He recorded more than a thousand terms in  Façons de parler proverbiales, triviales, figurées, etc. des Canadiens au xviiie siècle, the only known lexicon of French spoken in New France.

References

External links
 
 

People from Tournai
1708 births
 1781 deaths
French Roman Catholic missionaries
18th-century French Jesuits
Jesuit missionaries in New France
Lexicographers